The 15th Central American and Caribbean Junior Championships were held in the National Stadium in Bridgetown, Barbados between 5–7 July 2002. A discussion of the results is given.  Usain Bolt
of Jamaica set a total of 6 new championship records.

Records
A total of 22 new championship records were set.  Moreover, during the Girls' U-20 Javelin Throw, there were probably a couple of intermediate records set: Yuneisy Rodríguez of Cuba 46.96m, Ana Gutiérrez of Mexico 46.98m, and again Yuneisy Rodríguez 48.48m, as well as in the Girls' U-20 Triple Jump: Arianna Martínez of Cuba 13.43m, and Mabel Gay of Cuba 13.65m.

Key

Medal summary

The results are published.

Male Junior A (under 20)

Female Junior A (under 20)

†: Event marked as exhibition.

Male Junior B (under 17)

Female Junior B (under 17)

Medal table

The medal count was published.

Total

Participation (unofficial)

Detailed result lists can be found on the World Junior Athletics History website.  An unofficial count yields a number of about 443 athletes (257 junior (under-20) and 159 youth (under-17)) from about 32 countries, a new record number of participating nations:

 (4)
 (9)
 (2)
 (37)
 (44)
 (8)
 (2)
 (4)
 (3)
 (3)
 (2)
 (13)
 (5)
 (12)
 (6)
 (10)
 (7)
 (8)
 Haïti (1)
 (1)
 (65)
 México (50)
 (2)
 (1)
 Panamá (5)
 (47)
 (9)
 (7)
 (19)
 (41)
 (1)
 (17)

References

External links
Official CACAC Website
Local Championships Website
World Junior Athletics History

Central American and Caribbean Junior Championships in Athletics
Central American and Caribbean Junior Championships in Athletics
Central American and Caribbean Junior Championships in Athletics
International athletics competitions hosted by Barbados
Central American and Caribbean Junior Championships in Athletics